The Topps Company has created a number of different baseball card products during its existence. They originally started as a chewing gum company, using the baseball cards as a sales gimmick to make the gum more popular, but today it is primarily a baseball card company.

Topps brands

Factory sets
Topps remains the only baseball card company today to still offer factory sets of their base brand. Their first factory set was offered in 1974 exclusively in the J.C. Penney catalog, but Topps would not begin releasing factory sets again until 1982. The 1982 Topps Factory Set is rare due to J.C. Penney's failure to sell them. J.C. Penney factory sets were available in 1982 in a color box and 1983 (SKU 672–1203), 1984 (SKU 672–1641), and 1985 (SKU 672–2029) in brown boxes. From 1986 to 1992, Topps factory sets came in two designs, Retail (or Christmas) and Hobby dealer.  Retail factory sets were in very colorful boxes and were typically released near Christmas time (and for that reason are sometimes called Christmas sets).  Hobby dealer sets were in much plainer boxes until 1993.  Topps continues to this day to offer not only retail, hobby, and Christmas sets, but also team themed factory sets (starting in 2004) with bonus cards exclusive to each one.

Tiffany sets
From 1984 to 1991, Topps released a limited edition version of both their regular and traded sets called "Tiffany" sets.  These sets were released in hobby dealer exclusive factory set format only and are identical to the regular cards, but these were printed in Ireland with white cardboard (instead of the then-standard gray cardboard) with a glossy finish on the front.  The color of the inner boxes the Tiffany sets came in as well as the estimated number of sets produced (according to the annual Beckett price guide) are:

1984: Red (0000)
1985: Blue (5,000)
1986: Maroon (5,000)
1987: Violet (30,000)
1988: Green (25,000)
1989: Blue (15,000)
1990: Red (15,000)
1991: Navy (unknown, but believed to be the lowest print run of all, so <5,000)

Bowman

Bowman was Topps' main competitor from 1951 until Topps bought out Bowman after the 1955 season. Almost 35 years later, in 1989, Topps resurrected the Bowman brand and created a new annual baseball card set which was unique in two ways. First, the 1989 Bowman cards were 2.5" x 3.75" instead of the standard 2.5" x 3.5" card size (they went back to standard size from 1990 onwards however) and second, its main focus was on upcoming minor league players who Topps believed had a good chance of making it to the majors someday, which continues to be the focus of the Bowman set today. Although the Bowman sets were not very popular in its first three years, that changed in 1992 when Bowman was upgraded to a premium quality set (with UV coating on both sides and a special subset with bronze foil borders), and very limited production. Since then, Bowman has become more and more oriented towards prospects and rookies. New sets from several sister brands, as well as the core Bowman brand itself, continue to be released each year.

Since the mid-1990s the vast majority of the MLB's top stars were featured on a Bowman card prior to appearing in any other set. The incredible sustained level of success enjoyed by the Bowman brand has spurred a number of spin-off products, including Bowman Chrome, Bowman Sterling, Bowman Draft Picks and Prospects, Bowman's Best, Bowman Originals, and most recently, Bowman Platinum. The key to the brand's success lies in the fact that Bowman and Bowman Chrome rookie cards are typically the most valuable and sought after of all rookie cards. This is especially true for its baseball card releases.

Stadium Club
Topps released their first "premium" set in 1991 called Stadium Club.  This was the very first major baseball card set to feature glossy UV coating on both sides of the card as well as gold foil stamping on the front and a borderless (or "full-bleed") Kodak photo on the front.  The back of the card also featured an image of the player's first Topps card. This set was a major hit at the time with packs costing $5 or more. In 1992, Topps released three different series of Stadium Club cards. There was also a factory set from 1992 in which cards were packed in a reproduction dome stadium, made of plastic, but this was not the same as the regular 1992 Stadium Club set.

Topps Finest
Topps released their first "super premium" set in 1993 called Topps Finest (or just Finest for short).  These were issued in six card packs with 18 packs in a box and 12 boxes per case, and only 4,000 cases were produced.  This set was also a major hit with packs costing around $25 at the time.  Many hobbyists, however, frowned upon such an expensive set thinking that it was driving the hobby away from younger collectors.  Topps also included a Finest All-Star jumbo card (limited to about 1455 of each) in each box (a 4" x 6" version of the All-Star subset) and randomly inserted (1 in 18 packs) a Refractor insert card which was exactly like the regular card but with a rainbow sheen on the front with some of them worth over $1000 at that time.  Only 241 of each Refractor were produced and continue to this day to be highly sought after.

Topps Heritage / Bowman Heritage / Allen & Ginter

In 2001, Topps (for its fiftieth anniversary) released two new retro themed brands, Topps Heritage and Bowman Heritage, as part of its baseball, football and hockey card product lines. The novelty was that the brands had modern players with designs from past years. The baseball cards had the design from 1952 for its 2001 selection of Heritage baseball cards, 1953 design for 2002, 1954 design for 2003, and so on. Bowman Heritage was also started in 2001 and used the following throwback designs:
2001: 1948 Bowman
2002: 1954 Bowman
2003: proposed 1956 Bowman design (original 1956 set was not issued due to Topps' buyout of Bowman after 1955)
2004: 1955 Bowman
2005: 1951 Bowman
2006: 1949 Bowman

The Bowman Heritage brand was retired after the 2007 release, replaced by the much more popular and emerging Allen & Ginter brand that captivated collectors with its 2006 debut. In 2019, Bowman Heritage returned as an online-only exclusive product using the 1953 Bowman design. Topps Heritage became a baseball exclusive brand in 2007 where it is still an active brand to this day. It is widely considered to be one of the most popular perennial preseason baseball card release.

Topps T206 
The T206 name (originally issued in 1909-11 by the American Tobacco Company) has been revived by Topps (under the "Topps 206" brand) a total three times, the first in 2002 with a second revival in 2010. Again in 2020, the company released a new collection divided into five different series, with the first (50 cards) being released in May 2020. The collection, named "Topps 206", include players from both, Major and Minor League. The 5th series was released in September 2020.

The T206 Honus Wagner card was reissued by Topps in 2002, with variations on its background color. The card was printed with the original orange color of 1909 (#179), and also in blue (#307) and red (#456). In 2020, a new Honus Wagner card was issued by the company (#45) as part of the second wave (of 5) released that year.

Topps Project 2020
In 2020 Topps released Project 2020, a 400 card online exclusive set which featured 20 artists rendition of 20 iconic Topps Cards.

Topps baseball cards outside the United States
A Canadian licensed version of the Topps set was produced by candy company O-Pee-Chee from 1965 until 1992. From 1970 onward, the cards were bilingual in order to comply with Canadian language laws. There were also licensed version Topps sets issued in Venezuela from 1959 to 1977, with some changes and the addition of winter league players. In the late 1980s, Topps issued two sets for the United Kingdom market of American baseball players, complete with explanations of key baseball terms on the cards.

Products by year
Each year, Topps faced the challenge of designing new cards to distinguish them from the year before. The 1952 - 56 sets were varied in presentation, but each were the same size, 2 5/8" x 3 3/4". The '52, '53 and '54 sets were vertical, the '55 and '56 sets horizontal. In 1957, the 2 1/2 x 3 1/2" size card became standard. Also, the design changed dramatically and was now a photograph of the player and not a painting (particularly 1953). The 1957 set is one of the most sought after by hobbyists due to the photographic quality and simple card design. The 1957 set is almost borderless, and the player name, team name, and position are printed in small letters so the photograph of the player is the dominant feature. More colorful designs and larger borders resumed again until the highly popular 1961 set, which again has smaller borders and less obtrusive team names, player names, and positions.
 
Until 1964, the colors of the borders, print, letters, etc. was random. Starting with the '64 set, Topps began a trend where each team had their own color scheme. For example, every Dodger card in the 1964 set featured the team name "Dodgers" in red across the top of the card, with the player name and position written in a powder blue field along the bottom of the card. Topps generally had 10 different color scheme designs per year, one for each team in their respective league (National and American). Thus, one team in each league shared the same color scheme with one team in the other league.

Starting in 1966, Topps assigned a color scheme to each team that would repeat itself in the 1968 and 1969 sets. The schemes were as follows:
Yellow printing on a red background: Dodgers & Yankees
Yellow printing in a green background: Giants & Senators
White printing on a violet background: Pirates & Red Sox
White Printing on a blue background: Reds & Twins
White printing on a lavender background: Braves & Angels
Red printing on a gray background: Phillies & Indians
Red printing on a yellow background: Cardinals & Tigers
White printing on an orange background: Cubs & White Sox
Black printing on a lime green background: Astros & Orioles
Yellow printing on a purple background: Mets & Athletics

The 1969 set introduced two new color schemes to accommodate the expansion teams that began play in that year:
Black printing on a pink background: Expos & Royals
Yellow printing on a brown background: Padres & Pilots

Player depictions
Players generally gave multiple poses for Topps, and Topps chose which one to put on a card. Among these were head shots of the player with no cap, in case he was traded or the team moved. In 1966, the Braves moved from Milwaukee to Atlanta, so every card of a Braves player in the early series of cards is a head shot with no cap, or the cap logo is obstructed or hidden in some way (profile or cap tilted up). Only in the later series are there cards with Braves players wearing the new cap with the letter "A". The same is true for the Angels, whose move from Los Angeles to Anaheim caused a change in their cap logo from and "LA" to a "CA" as they switched from being called the Los Angeles Angels to the California Angels.  In later years, Topps developed an airbrush technique where the cap logo would be manually altered or blacked out. For example, the 1968 Athletics, after moving from Kansas City to Oakland, are pictured wearing blacked out caps with green bills.

Topps generally put the biggest stars on card numbers ending in x00 or x50. For example, in the 1966 set, Mickey Mantle is card #50 and Sandy Koufax is card #100. In 1965, Willie Mays is card #250. Other star players were put on card numbers ending in zero (10, 20, 140, 270, etc.) and minor stars were put on cards ending in "5".  Topps continues this numbering system (at least to a degree) today.

References

External links 
 Cards and collectibles on Topps
 Topps Sports Cards on CardboardConnection
 Topps baseball cards on DiamondCards

Chewing gum
Baseball cards
Trading cards